The Archdiocese of Fortaleza is an archdiocese located in the city of Fortaleza in Brazil.

History
On June 6, 1854, it was established by Pope Pius IX, as the Diocese of Ceará from the Diocese of Olinda. Formerly a part of the Diocese of Pernambuco, the district was erected into a separate diocese, suffragan to the Archdiocese of Bahia. João Guerino Gomes was named as first bishop but did not accept the appointment. Father Gomes, who was famous in his day both as an orator and as a philosopher, died in 1859. The first bishop, Luis Antonio dos Santos, founded the diocesan seminaries at Fortaleza and Crato, and, for the education of girls, the College of the Immaculate Conception, besides building the church of the Sacred Heart at Fortaleza. On November 10, 1915, it was promoted as the Metropolitan Archdiocese of Fortaleza.

Special churches
Basílica São Francisco das Chagas, Canindé

Bishops
 Bishops of Ceará 
 Luís Antônio dos Santos (28 September 1860 – 13 March 1881), appointed Archbishop of São Salvador da Bahia
 Joaquim José Vieira (9 August 1883 – 14 September 1912)
 Manoel da Silva Gomes (16 September 1912 – 10 November 1915)
 Archbishops of Fortaleza 
 Manoel da Silva Gomes (10 November 1915 – 24 May 1941)
 Antônio de Almeida Lustosa, S.D.B. (19 July 1941 – 16 February 1963)
 José de Medeiros Delgado (10 May 1963 – 26 March 1973)
 Aloísio Lorscheider, O.F.M. (26 March 1973 – 12 July 1995), elevated to Cardinal in 1976; appointed Archbishop of Aparecida, Sao Paulo
 Cláudio Hummes, O.F.M. (26 May 1996 – 15 April 1998), appointed Archbishop of São Paulo (Cardinal in 2001)
 José Antônio Aparecido Tosi Marques (13 January 1999 – present)

Coadjutor bishop
Manuel Antônio de Oliveira Lopes (1908-1910), did not succeed to see; appointed Bishop of Alagôas

Auxiliary bishops
Manoel da Silva Gomes (1911-1912), appointed Bishop here
Elizeu Simões Mendes (1950-1953), appointed Bishop of Mossoró, Rio Grande do Norte
Expedito Eduardo de Oliveira (1953-1959), appointed Bishop of Patos, Paraiba
Raimundo de Castro e Silva (1957-1991)
Gérard-Paul-Louis-Marie de Milleville, C.S.Sp. (1964-1984); Archbishop (personal title)
Miguel Fenelon Câmara Filho (1970-1974), appointed Coadjutor Archbishop of Maceió, Alagoas
Manuel Edmilson da Cruz (1974-1994), appointed	Bishop of Limoeiro do Norte, Ceara
Geraldo Nascimento, O.F.M. Cap. (1992-1997)
Adalberto Paulo da Silva, O.F.M. Cap. (1995-2004)
Sérgio da Rocha (2001-2007), appointed Coadjutor Archbishop of Teresina, Piaui; future Cardinal
Plínio José Luz da Silva (2001-2003), appointed Bishop of Picos, Piaui
José Luiz Ferreira Salles, C.SS.R. (2006-2012), appointed Bishop of Pesqueira, Pernambuco
Rosalvo Cordeiro de Lima (2011-
José Luiz Gomes de Vasconcelos (2012-2015), appointed Bishop of Sobral, Ceara
Valdemir Vicente Andrade Santos (2018-
Júlio César Souza de Jesus (2018-

Other priests of this diocese who became bishops
Antônio Xisto Albano, appointed Bishop of São Luís do Maranhão in 1901
Quintino Rodrigues de Oliveira e Silva, appointed Bishop of Piaui in 1913 (did not take effect); appointed Bishop of Crato, Ceara in 1915

Suffragan dioceses
 Diocese of Crateús
 Diocese of Crato
 Diocese of Iguatu
 Diocese of Itapipoca
 Diocese of Limoeiro do Norte
 Diocese of Quixadá
 Diocese of Sobral
 Diocese of Tianguá

References

Sources

 GCatholic.org
 Catholic Hierarchy
 Archdiocese website (Portuguese)

Roman Catholic dioceses in Brazil
Fortaleza
 
Religious organizations established in 1854
Roman Catholic dioceses and prelatures established in the 19th century
1854 establishments in Brazil